Ordeal was a New Zealand Standardbred racemare. A notable achievement was winning the Rowe Cup, the top event in New Zealand for trotting horses. Ordeal was considered the top trotter in New Zealand in the 1960s, but had moderate success in the United States. She was the first ever trotter to break the 2:00 mile barrier in New Zealand.

Ordeal won the following major races:
 1960 Dominion Handicap (Handicap of 12 yards) 
 1961 Rowe Cup

She was an inaugural inductee into the New Zealand Trotting Hall of Fame with the immortals Caduceus, Cardigan Bay, Harold Logan, Highland Fling and Johnny Globe.

See also
 Harness racing
 Harness racing in New Zealand

Reference list

New Zealand standardbred racehorses
Inter Dominion winners
Rowe Cup winners
Dominion Handicap winners
New Zealand Trotting Hall of Fame horses
1957 racehorse births